A twilight phenomenon is produced when exhaust particles from missile or rocket propellant left in the vapor trail of a launch vehicle condense, freeze, and then expand in the less dense upper atmosphere. The exhaust plume, which is suspended against a dark sky, is then illuminated by reflective high-altitude sunlight through dispersion, which produces a spectacular, colorful effect when seen at ground level.

The phenomenon typically occurs with launches that take place either 30 to 60 minutes before sunrise or after sunset when a booster rocket or missile rises out of the darkness and into a sunlit area, relative to an observer's perspective on the ground. Because rocket trails extend high into the stratosphere and mesosphere, they catch high-altitude sunlight long after the sun has set on the ground. The small particles in the expanding exhaust plume or "cloud" diffract sunlight and produce the rose, blue, green and orange colors—much like a dispersive prism can be used to break light up into its constituent spectral colors (the colors of the rainbow) – thereby making the twilight phenomenon all the more spectacular.

The exhaust plume may also take on a corkscrew appearance as it is whipped around by upper-level wind currents. It is typically seen within two to three minutes after a launch has occurred. Depending on weather conditions, it could remain in the sky for up to half an hour before dispersing.

At Vandenberg AFB in California, more than 1,800 missiles and space boosters have been launched from the central California coastline in northern Santa Barbara County since December 1958. However, only a small percentage of these launches have created the twilight phenomenon. The same is true with the U.S. Navy's Strategic Systems Programs, which conducts Trident II (D5) missile test flights at sea from Ohio Class SSBN submarines in the Pacific Test Range off the coast of Southern California, or Kokola Point at Barking Sands on the Hawaiian island of Kauai.

Some observers have wrongly assumed the missile or rocket creating the aerial spectacle must have malfunctioned or been destroyed while in flight. That belief stems from the appearance of the launch vehicle's contrail as it becomes twisted into knots by upper altitude air currents or wind shear. To date, no malfunctioning missile or rocket has been known to create the phenomenon. On the rare occasions when a missile or rocket does malfunction, it is destroyed by a Range Safety Officer before reaching the altitudes where twilight phenomenon occur.

The phenomenon's appearance and intensity varies with viewer location and weather conditions—typically, clear skies with no moonlight, since cloud cover would block one's view. The phenomenon can usually be seen throughout the state of California, and as far away as Arizona, Nevada and Utah. On the East Coast, similar sightings were observed and reported during twilight launches of the Space Shuttle from NASA's Kennedy Space Center, and observed after other expendable launch vehicles from the U.S. Space Force's launch complexes at Cape Canaveral Space Force Station in Florida.

Numerous nations with a space program — such as the European Space Agency, the Russian Space Agency, the China National Space Agency, Japan's JAXA, India's ISRO and other countries have experienced the same event.

Examples

In 2010 a contrail from an airplane in California had people believing they had seen a missile launch.
On July 7, 2010, reports of a "UFO" sighting forced Xiaoshan Airport in Hangzhou, China to temporarily cease operations. A flight crew preparing for descent saw the object—suspected to be a Chinese rocket test—as a bright twinkling light apparently above the runway, and notified the air traffic control department. ATC could not locate it on radar and diverted landing flights. Eighteen flights were affected. Though normal operations resumed four hours later, the incident captured the attention of the Chinese media and sparked a firestorm of speculation on the UFO's identity. 
On November 7, 2015 a bright plume of light was seen expanding then "exploding" over south California between 7-8pm. The Orange County Sheriff confirmed that it was a Trident II ballistic missile test firing from the USS Kentucky.

See also 

Noctilucent clouds
Space jellyfish

References

Video
 RUS Progress MS-10 launch, as seen from the International Space Station over Baikonur, Kazakhstan Taken by ESA astronaut Alexander Gerst, Nov. 16, 2018
 SpaceX Iridium 4 launch, as seen from Alhambra, Calif. Misrraim Sanchez YouTube video, Dec. 22, 2017
 Iridium NEXT IV launch, as seen from Manhattan Beach, Calif. Scott Gauer YouTube video, Dec. 22, 2017
 SpaceX Falcon 9 Launch, Boostback, Entry Burn Justin Foley's YouTube video, Dec. 22, 2017
 SpaceX launch video from Phoenix news helicopter Entire raw video as seen from PenguinAir Newschopper flying above Phoenix, Arizona Dec. 22, 2017
Explaining The Amazing Rocket Trail Over LA Scott Manley's YouTube video, Dec. 24, 2017
Falcon 9 rocket launch provides spectacular view in Bakersfield KBAK-29 Eyewitness News / KBFX-58 Fox News / BakersfieldNow.com (via YouTube), Dec. 22, 2017
Justin Majeczky's 40-second time lapse of U.S. Navy Trident II (D5) missile test, as seen from San Francisco Vimeo, Nov. 8, 2015
 Missile launch over San Francisco YouTube video, Nov. 8, 2015
Atlas V Rocket Launch view from East Orlando, Florida YouTube video Sept 2, 2015
Night Time Launch Of Russian Space Rocket Heading To ISS YouTube video Feb. 15, 2014
Video of "UFO" over Xiaoshan Airport in Hangzhou, China YouTube video July 7, 2010

External links 
A photographer shot an awesome time-lapse of SpaceX’s recent rocket launch from Yuma, Arizona The Verge, Dec. 26, 2017 
 Dashcam video shows three-car crash as freeway drivers brake for SpaceX rocket launch Los Angeles Times, Dec. 26, 2017
What was that light in the sky? SpaceX Falcon 9 launch offers dramatic show over L.A. Los Angeles Times, Dec. 22, 2017
Light from Navy test fire courses across the Southern California and Arizona sky Los Angeles Times, Nov. 8, 2015 (The same missile launch as seen over San Francisco)
Mystery light above L.A. brings fear, anger and questions Los Angeles Times, Nov. 8, 2015
UFO scares are the price we pay for secret missile tests, expert says Los Angeles Times, Nov. 8, 2015
 Mystery light streaking across Bay Area skies was a test missile SF Gate, Nov. 8, 2015
No UFO Here! Mysterious Flying Object Seen in Southern California Was Just a Missile Test People Magazine Online, Nov. 8, 2015
Everybody lost it when a Navy missile lit up the night sky over the West Coast Business Insider, Nov. 7, 2015
Rocket Trails at Twilight Illuminate the Sky
 Rocket Twilight Phenomenon
2020 Hindsight: Whee! Ooh! Aah! Pretty!
Rocket puts on "Streak" show  Santa Maria Times, Sept. 23, 2005
National Defense Light Show Treebeard's Stumper Answer, Sept. 27, 2002
Minuteman-II launch from Vandenberg AFB Goleta Air & Space Museum, July 14, 2001 
Rocket Launches Fred Bruenjes' Astronomy Stuff, June 7, 2007
Space Archive
SoCal SkyLights

Spaceflight